Abolhassan Najafi (also Romanized as "Abolhasan Najafī"; 28 June 1929 – 22 January 2016) was an Iranian writer and translator.

Najafi was born in Najaf, Iraq, into a family from Isfahan. He began his literary activities in the 1960s and translated several books from French into Persian. He co-published a successful literary periodical entitled Jong-e Isfahan. After the Iranian revolution, he published a controversial book on Persian usage entitled Let's Avoid Mistakes.

Najafi published more than twenty books, among these a dictionary on Persian slang, elements of general linguistics and its application to the Persian language. He translated French novels to Persian, notable works from Jean-Paul Sartre (Le Diable et le bon Dieu, Les sequestres d'Altona, Qu'est-ce que la litérature), André Malraux (Antimémoire), Albert Camus (Caligula), Roger Martin du Gard (Les Thibault), Claude Lévi-Strauss (La race et l'histoire), and Antoine de Saint-Exupéry (Le Petit Prince).

Najafi was a member of the Academy of Persian Language and Literature (1990–2016).

References

Linguists from Iran
Iranian translators
Writers from Isfahan
1929 births
2016 deaths
Members of the Academy of Persian Language and Literature
People from Najaf
French–Persian translators
Grammarians of Persian
Linguists of Persian
Iranian grammarians
20th-century translators
Translation scholars